A Gasr (plural Gsur) is a fortified building found predominantly in Libya.

There is much conjecture about their relation to centenarium built by invading Ancient Roman forces.

References

Geography of Libya
Ancient Libya
Tripolitania